The Industrial Reorganisation Corporation was an entity established by the Government of the United Kingdom to reorganise British industry.

History
The corporation was established by the First Wilson ministry in 1966 with the objective of encouraging mergers to make British industries more competitive. Its activities included facilitating the merger of GEC and AEI in 1966 and of the merger of that enlarged entity with English Electric in 1968. It also facilitated the merger of British Motor Corporation with Leyland Motors in 1968 and the merger of RHP, a ball bearing manufacturer, with Ransome & Marles in 1969. It was wound up by the Heath ministry in 1970. The Chairman throughout most of its life was Sir Frank Kearton.

References

Defunct public bodies of the United Kingdom